Pomßen is a village some 20 kilometres from Leipzig, Germany. Since 1994, it is part of the municipality of Parthenstein.

There is a fortified church of architectural and historical interest. It has an organ built by Gottfried Richter (1643–1717) The church is also of interest to music historians for its association with J.S. Bach. His cantata Ich lasse dich nicht, du segnest mich denn, BWV 157 was performed there in 1727.

Pomssen is the birthplace of Gerhard Kretschmar, a victim of Hitler's program to exterminate children. Kretschmar was born blind, with one leg and one arm. He was killed at the age of only 5 months by direct order from Hitler. He was buried in the Lutheran Cemetery nearby.

References

Former municipalities in Saxony
Leipzig (district)